Loren Bain (born Herbert Loren Bain) (July 4, 1922 – November 24, 1996) was a Major League Baseball pitcher. He played with the New York Giants in 1945. He then worked as a bottler for Coca-Cola, retiring to Chetek, Wisconsin in 1968.

References

External links

People from Staples, Minnesota
New York Giants (NL) players
Major League Baseball pitchers
1922 births
1996 deaths
Baseball players from Minnesota
People from Chetek, Wisconsin
Eau Claire Bears players
Fort Worth Cats players
Minneapolis Millers (baseball) players
Richmond Colts players